Zabrus femoratus is a species of ground beetle in the Pelor subgenus. It was described by Dejean in 1828 and is found in Bulgaria, Greece, European part of Turkey and in Near East.

References

Beetles described in 1828
Beetles of Asia
Beetles of Europe
Zabrus